Ruffinelli is a surname. Notable people with the surname include:

Jorge Ruffinelli (born 1943), Uruguayan academic and critic
Luis Ruffinelli (1889–1973), Paraguayan playwright, journalist, and political activist
Mikel Ruffinelli (born 1972), American woman